The Dome of the Prophet, also known as the Dome of the Messenger and the Dome of Muhammed is a free-standing dome located on the Al-Masjid Al-Aqsa enclave, in Jerusalem (known to Muslims as al-Haram al-Sharif). It is located on the northwest part of the elevated platform where the Dome of the Rock stands.

History
Originally, built during the Umayyad period, the dome was subsequently destroyed by the Crusaders. In 1539, the dome was rebuilt by Muhammad Bey, Ottoman Governor of Jerusalem during the regin of Sultan the Magnificent/Kanuni Sultan Süleyman. Its last renovation was in the reign of Sultan Abdul Majid II.

Several Muslim writers, most notably al-Suyuti and al-Vâsıtî claimed that the site of the dome is where Muhammad led the former prophets and angels in prayer on the night of Isra and Mir'aj before ascending to Heaven. Endowment documents from the Ottoman period indicate that a portion of the endowment of the al-Aqsa Mosque and Haseki Sultan Imaret  was dedicated to maintain the lighting of an oil-lamp in the Dome of the Prophet each night.

Architecture
The Dome of the Prophet's octagonal structure is built atop eight gray marble columns. The dome, which is covered with sheet lead and being without walls, is hemispherical and is supported by pointed arches decorated with red, black and white stones. The ancient mihrab is made of a white marble slab embedded in the floor and surrounded by red-colored stones and subsequently delimited by a low wall, that traditionally opened in the north to allow entrance of Muslim believers heading southward to Mecca in Muslim prayers.

References

External links 

Buildings and structures completed in 1538
Temple Mount
Buildings and structures of the Ottoman Empire
Architecture in the State of Palestine
Shrines in Jerusalem
1538 establishments in the Ottoman Empire
Religious buildings and structures with domes